The Lighthouse is a 2016 British psychological thriller drama film directed by Chris Crow and written by Paul Bryant, Chris Crow and Michael Jibson. The film is based on the Smalls Lighthouse incident which occurred in 1801.

Plot 
In 1801, Thomas Howell and Thomas Griffith are stationed at Smalls Island Lighthouse to man the lighthouse 25 miles from land in the Irish Sea. After a storm strands the men, they begin developing cabin fever and slowly lose their minds.

Cast 
 Mark Lewis Jones as Thomas Griffiths
 Michael Jibson as Thomas Howell

Release
The film was released in the United Kingdom on 8 July 2016 and in the United States on 6 July 2018.

Critical reception
The film has  critical rating on Rotten Tomatoes with  reviews. James Berardinelli of Reelviews gave the film a positive review stating "the high production values, excellent acting, and strong writing make this a cut above what is often accorded this sort of release pattern". Noel Murray of The Los Angeles Times gave the film a positive review stating, "Jones and Jibson (the latter of whom also worked on the script) play this material like an intimate theatre piece, finding the finer nuances in their characters' simmering animosity". Frank Scheck of The Hollywood Reporter described the film as "tensely atmospheric" and "benefits immeasurably from the powerful performances by Jones and Jibson". Guy Lodge of Variety gave the film a negative review stating the film is "a bleak nugget of Welsh maritime history [which] is given a Gothic spin by British filmmaker Chris Crow, to resolute but less-than-gripping effect".

References

External links 
 

2016 films
2016 psychological thriller films
2016 thriller drama films
British psychological thriller films
British thriller drama films
Films set on islands
Works set in lighthouses
2016 drama films
2010s English-language films
2010s British films